Cue Ball is a venture capital firm in Boston, Massachusetts. Cue Ball makes investments in venture and early stage companies in consumer and media businesses, focusing on lifestyle brands and services, restaurants and specialty retail, information data services, and social media and commerce. It was founded in 2005.

History
The firm's partners include Anthony Tjan, John Hamel, and Mats Lederhausen. Richard Harrington, former Thomson Reuters CEO, serves as chairman and general partner. The investment team includes Tony Pino and William Rice.

References

External links
 Investing.businessweek.com

Financial services companies established in 2005
Companies based in Boston
Venture capital firms of the United States